Simun (also Romanized as Sīmūn; also known as Karak) is a village in Deh Abbas Rural District, in the Central District of Eslamshahr County, Tehran Province, Iran. At the 2006 census, its population was 211, in 48 families.

References 

Populated places in Eslamshahr County